Cradles to Crayons (C2C) is a non-profit organization that provides resources such as school supplies and clothing to homeless and low-income children. Cradles To Crayons began in Quincy, Massachusetts, in 2002. Cradles to Crayons has since expanded to Philadelphia, Pennsylvania, in 2006 and Chicago, Illinois, in 2016, with their program the Giving Factory. Cradles to Crayons has partnerships in their headquartered cities Boston, Massachusetts, Philadelphia, and Chicago with various news outlets, sports teams, and other organizations.

History
Founder and CEO Lynn Margherio saw the opportunity for Cradles to Crayons while visiting her family over the holidays in 2001.  She noticed her nieces' and nephews' toys and clothes piled high in the playroom and closets at her brother's house; these items were in perfectly good condition but were no longer being used.  From these and similar experiences, C2C was shaped by a vision that existing community resources could be leveraged to benefit economically disadvantaged children, bridging the gap between those who have too much and those who do not have enough. In 2002, Cradles to Crayons officially opened its doors in Quincy, Massachusetts, and after five successful years of providing critically needed items to local disadvantaged children, the Cradles to Crayons model was replicated to help children in Philadelphia, Pennsylvania. In 2011, we relocated our Massachusetts Giving Factory to a larger space in Brighton with the goal of doubling our impact over the next three to five years. C2C's unique business model provides an avenue through which children's products in good working condition can be recycled in a socially and environmentally responsible way.

Locations

Philadelphia
In the greater Philadelphia area, nearly 300,000 children live in poverty. Cradles to Crayons Philadelphia has helped out children from birth to the age of 12, providing essential items for school and home. Cradles to Crayons Philadelphia throws annual campaigns like their "Ready for School" initiative. This campaign urges individuals and businesses in Philadelphia to help provide resources to local homeless children. The money donated towards this campaign is used to distribute new "Kidpacks", which are filled with school supplies to help homeless kids feel prepared and excited to learn. Cradles to Crayon's goal is to make it as easy as possible to donate. Cradles to Crayon's goal is "making it convenient to turn compassion into action."

Boston 
Among communities across Massachusetts, C2C is looked to as a leader in the non-profit sector. In 2011, Cradles to Crayons was acknowledged as an innovative grassroots leader and was recognized with the "Partnership of the Year" award from the Boston Business Journal for their work with Staples, and received the prestigious Neighborhood Builder Award from Bank of America. In that same year, C2C was honored to be chosen by Massachusetts Governor, Deval Patrick, to host his inaugural Project 351 event, a day of public service with 8th Grade representatives from each of Massachusetts' 351 cities and towns. This year C2C was honored to serve again as a site for Project 351. Deval Patrick led a day of community service in the warehouse with hundreds of high schools students from Massachusetts.

Chicago 
In October 2016, Cradles to Crayons opened its Chicago location in a 20,000-square-foot warehouse facility titled the Giving Factory. Cradle To Crayons' goal for the Chicago office is similar to the goal of the organization's other locations in Boston, Massachusetts, and Philadelphia. The organization's main objective is to provide underprivileged children with life's basic needs such as clothes and school supplies. Several volunteers within the Chicago community welcomed Cradles to Crayons by contributing to the organization's goal of receiving 16,000 donations, so children above the age of 12 can get off the streets and into a better living situation. Many basic living essentials are donated and are put through a screening process. If the items donated do not meet the organization's standards, they are recycled or given to other charities that may be able to use them.

The Giving Factory 
The Giving Factory uses corporate, school, and neighborhood volunteers who sort the donated items based on clothing size, reading level, and interests. Based on the success Cradles to Crayons has had at its Boston and Philadelphia locations, the organization wanted to ensure that all children in Chicago had access to these resources regardless of their families' income. In one year Cradles to Crayons' Chicago office provided 47,211 children with supplies. Cradles to Crayons arrived in Chicago with a plan of creating events for volunteers to work at. In its first year in Chicago, Cradles to Crayons had 6,000 volunteers. In an effort to attract more volunteers to work with the Chicago office, Cradles to Crayons has hosted "behind the scenes" events of its Chicago Giving Factory. Adults that are 21 and over are given a tour of the Chicago factory and get a first-hand observation at the progress Cradles to Crayons has been making in the Chicago area. As of December 2018, the Chicago location appointed a new director, Shoshana Buchholz-Miller, and the organization hopes to motivate more Chicagoans to volunteer at the Giving Factory.

Services and programs

Cradles to Crayons' programs operate year-round to support disadvantaged children across the state of Massachusetts, providing the essentials each child needs to overcome their unique situations and excel both inside and outside of the classroom. C2C collects new and gently used children's items through grass roots community drives. Donated items are then sorted, inspected and packaged into personalized "C2C KidPacks" by volunteers. KidPacks are filled with clothing, shoes, books, arts and crafts, and often birthday presents. KidPacks are brought directly to the families free of charge, through partnerships with hundreds of qualified social service agencies across Massachusetts such as Catholic Charities, The Home for Little Wanderers and Horizons for Homeless Children.

Cradles to Crayons' signature program, Everyday Essentials, operates without interruption; programs are focused with seasonal initiatives. From July through September, Ready for School provides children with the materials they need to feel ready to learn from head to toe, including a special emphasis on providing thousands of new backpacks with necessary school supplies.  In 2017, Ready for School served 70,000 children. Gear Up for Winter supplies kids with the cold weather gear that they need to stay warm. During the traditional spring cleaning months, Spring Greening encourages families to clean out their closets and donate their gently used items to C2C. Gear Up for Baby focuses on gathering infant and child safety equipment throughout May and June.

Events

2018 
In April 2018, in partnership with Comcast and from assistance from hundreds of volunteers, Cradles for Crayons packaged more than 7,500 hygiene kits for children across Chicago. That same month, CTC also partnered with Metropolitan Family Services in their collaboration with Walgreens, Huggies, and former Chicago Cubs catcher David Ross to distribute 250,000, a $10,000 donation, and 1.5 million diapers to the younger aid receivers. The following month saw CTC partner with television networks NBC 5 and Telemundo along with several Xfinity stores in an effort to gather more donations. Later in August, CTC teamed up with Jordans Furniture by collecting new and like-new clothing and shoes at all store locations and at the Taunton Distribution Center. The total amount of donations were enough to assist more than 3,000 children in need. October saw the nonprofit hold an interactive 21+ event in its factory that showcased daily operations and practices. In December, CTC held an event for volunteers to come into their warehouse on the Northwest side to help meet the increased demand for the holiday season.

2019 
In June 2019, Cradles to Crayons teamed up with Jordans Furniture again by collecting new and like-new clothing and shoes at all store locations and at the Taunton Distribution Center. Jordans Furniture donation has helped Cradles to Crayons by collecting enough clothing to provide for 3,000 children. Later in August, Cradles to Crayons held an event in Chicago's Daley plaza to fill 50,000 backpacks with school supplies for homeless or low-income children. In October, twenty locations across Chicago, including the Oak Park Public Library, held that year's annual Gear Up For Winter initiative where gently-used coats and other winter clothing items were collected to later be donated.

Impact
Cradles to Crayons has distributed more than 290,000 packages of essential items to disadvantaged Massachusetts children, including 127,000 backpacks filled with brand new school supplies. In 2011 Cradles to Crayons engaged more than 24,000 volunteers in the "Giving Factory" warehouse to fill 55,000 packages for disadvantaged Massachusetts children. Cradles to Crayons' overarching goal is to eliminate the effects of child poverty throughout the Commonwealth; their short-term goal is to continue connecting communities of need with communities of plenty.

Media
Cradles to Crayons was reviewed by Charity Navigator, an organization which evaluates the financial health, accountability and transparency of America's largest charities.

Cradles to Crayons was featured in the December 2011 issue of O, The Oprah Magazine.

References

External links 
 Cradles to Crayons
 Charity Navigator

Organizations established in 2002
Non-profit organizations based in Boston
Non-profit organizations based in Pennsylvania
Charities based in Massachusetts
Homelessness charities